The first Sirisena cabinet was a central government of Sri Lanka led by President Maithripala Sirisena. It was formed in January 2015 after the presidential election and ended in August 2015 following the parliamentary election.

Cabinet members
Ministers appointed under article 43(1) of the constitution.

State ministers
Ministers appointed under article 44(1) of the constitution.

Deputy ministers
Ministers appointed under article 45(1) of the constitution.

✝ Died while in office.

Notes

References

2015 establishments in Sri Lanka
2015 disestablishments in Sri Lanka
Cabinets established in 2015
Cabinets disestablished in 2015
Cabinet of Sri Lanka
Maithripala Sirisena